Blanche Huber (c. 1900 – 1940) was the first female doctor in Malta. She was also the first known female medical student in Malta, and graduated as a doctor from the University of Malta in 1925, having entered it in 1919. However, she always practiced as a pharmacist in Żejtun.

Blanche Huber was born in Birkirkara, to Hon Joseph Huber and she later married Dr. Joseph Caruana, a fellow medical professional.

She was one of the first female students at the University of Malta, enrolling in October 1919 along with Tessie Camilleri.

Huber died on 19 July 1940 at the age of 40. Blanche Huber Street in Sliema is named after her.

References

University of Malta alumni
20th-century Maltese physicians
Women physicians
Maltese pharmacists
Women pharmacists
People from Birkirkara
1940 deaths
Maltese women scientists
Year of birth uncertain
20th-century Maltese women